Tenko is a television drama series co-produced by the BBC and the Australian Broadcasting Corporation (ABC), which was broadcast between 1981 and 1985.

The series dealt with the experiences of British, Australian and Dutch women who were captured after the Fall of Singapore in February 1942, after the Japanese invasion, and held in a fictional Japanese internment camp on a Japanese-occupied island between Singapore and Australia. Having been separated from their husbands, herded into makeshift holding camps and largely forgotten by the British War Office, the women had to learn to cope with appalling living conditions, malnutrition, disease, violence and death.

Background

Tenko was created by Lavinia Warner after she had conducted research into the internment of nursing corps officer Margot Turner (1910–1993) for an edition of This Is Your Life and was convinced of the dramatic potential of the stories of women prisoners of the Japanese. Aside from the first two episodes, set in Singapore, which were written by Paul Wheeler, the series was written by Jill Hyem and Anne Valery. War hero and prisoner of war Margaret Thomson was consulted about the series but she did not like to talk about her experiences and never watched the programmes.

Owing to high production costs, only the first two episodes of the first series were filmed on location in Singapore, together with the post series reunion extended episode. For the majority of series 1 and 2, set in the camp, the programme was filmed in a specially constructed set in Dorset. Hankley Common was also used.

The series takes its name from the Japanese word "tenko" (点呼/てんこ) which means "roll-call".  POWs and internees in Japanese-run camps had regular roll-calls, where they had to line up and number off or were counted in Japanese.

A total of thirty episodes were produced over three series between 1981 and 1984, followed by a one-off special (which was twice the length of the other episodes), Tenko Reunion, in 1985. Only Ann Bell, Stephanie Cole and Claire Oberman appeared in all thirty episodes plus the reunion.

Series One (1981)

Ten fifty-minute episodes broadcast between 22 October-24 December 1981.

The first series depicts the fall of Singapore to the invading Japanese forces in 1942, and the abortive evacuation of civilians from the city. A group of British and Dutch women find themselves forced to cope with captivity in a Japanese internment camp. They also must find a way to live together as a community, breaking down the barriers of class and race between them, if they are to survive.

Marion Jefferson is enlisted as the leader of the women due to her husband being a colonel. Sylvia Ashburton learns to see past race when she begins to bond with Christina Campbell. Dorothy Bennet suffers the loss of her infant daughter, Violet, due to malnutrition. A pregnant Sally Markham suffers the tragedy of stillbirth. Sally then grows close to nurse Nellie Keane, and rumours begin to circulate about their intimacy.

In the last episode of the series, the women celebrate Christmas before being marched through the jungle to another camp.

Series Two (1982)

Ten fifty-minute episodes broadcast between 21 October-23 December 1982.

The second series continues with the women marching through the jungle and being split up before they arrive at a new camp, an old mission school, on New Year's Day 1943. Tensions arise as the internees are forced to adhere to the new regime implemented by the strict and fierce official interpreter, Miss Hasan.

After a joyous reunion with old friend, Lillian, Marion is forced to take a backseat as the women's official leader in favour of the overbearing wolf in sheep's clothing, Verna Johnson. Sally sinks into depression following the death of her husband and vows to take her own life. Dorothy continues to trade favours with the guards, teaching English to Shinya in exchange for cigarettes and later discovers that she is pregnant. Sister Ulrica vows to not speak in order to repent for her feelings of hate towards the Japanese. Blanche returns later in the series, as does Yamauchi, as he is promoted to Major and becomes the new commander. Rose escapes to meet Bernard but they are caught when one of the women informs Yamauchi.

As conditions in the camp worsen, the women take a stand against Verna and Mrs. Hasan but they are prevented from exposing them when an allied plane bombs the camp.

Series Three (1984)

Ten fifty-minute episodes broadcast between 7 October-16 December 1984.

The third series is set during 1945. The Second World War is over as the Japanese have surrendered. The survivors of the camps are liberated by Allied troops and travel to Singapore. Billeted at Raffles, the women are free. However, peacetime only brings further dilemmas for the women as they struggle to forge new futures in an uncertain new world.

Marion struggles as she assumes the role of the "colonel's wife" which causes friction between Clifford and herself. Joss strikes up a relationship with Stephen. Maggie and Dorothy become embroiled in a love triangle with the handsome rogue, Jake.

Tenko Reunion (1985)

A double-length special was broadcast on 26 December 1985.

Set in 1950, Marion organises for the women to reunite in Singapore five years after their liberation from the camp. After an evening at Raffles, the women plan to continue their celebrations the following day at the residence of 'Metro Goldwyn' van Meyer but they are interrupted by the infiltration from mercenaries in search of weapons and ammunition, leading to a shocking revelation about one of the women.

Main cast list

DVD release and books
All three series plus the Reunion Special were released in one DVD box-set in 2011 through Acorn Media UK.

Three paperback books were published in the 1980s. One covering the first series, titled Tenko, while a second called Last Tenko, covered the second and final series. The third book, written by Anne Valery, covered the Reunion.

A book about the making of Tenko called Remembering Tenko by Andy Priestner was published in October 2012.

References

External links
Tenko a website authorised by creator Lavinia Warner

Complete cast list and episode guide
Lavinia Warner's page on Tenko
RealPlayer version of the opening titles, at the BBC Cult homepage
A brief essay on the series, and an episode guide

1981 Australian television series debuts
1981 British television series debuts
1985 Australian television series endings
1985 British television series endings
1980s British drama television series
Australian Broadcasting Corporation original programming
BBC television dramas
British prison television series
Television series set in the 1940s
Television series set in 1941
Television series set in 1942
Television series set in 1943
Television series set in 1945
World War II television drama series
English-language television shows
Television series by BBC Studios